The Rockwell City Bridge is located just east of Rockwell City, Iowa, United States.  The  span carried traffic on 270th Street over an unnamed stream.  In 1915 Calhoun County requested the Iowa State Highway Commission (ISHC) and Des Moines engineer James B. Marsh to design a bridge for this crossing.  The ISHC designed a double span concrete girder structure, while Marsh submitted his patented single-span rainbow arch configuration.  They chose the Marsh submission, and contracted with the Iowa Bridge Company to build six bridges for $11,690, which included the costs for this bridge at $4,107.65.  Originally built to serve a county road, it was later incorporated into the route for U.S. Highway 20 and carried heavy traffic until the highway was realigned in 1981.  While no longer in use, the bridge remains in place just south of the replacement span.  It was listed on the National Register of Historic Places in 1998.

In 2020, the bridge and some adjacent land was turned into a roadside park managed by Calhoun County Conservation.

References

Bridges completed in 1915
Bridges in Calhoun County, Iowa
Arch bridges in Iowa
Road bridges on the National Register of Historic Places in Iowa
National Register of Historic Places in Calhoun County, Iowa
Concrete bridges in the United States